Estes is an unincorporated community in southwestern Pike County, in the U.S. state of Missouri. The community is on Missouri Route Y approximately eleven miles southwest of Bowling Green. The elevation of Estes is 738 feet.

History
A post office called Estes was established in 1886, and remained in operation until 1906. The community has the name of one Mr. Estes, a local merchant.

References

Unincorporated communities in Pike County, Missouri
Unincorporated communities in Missouri